Dagstuhl Castle (in German: Burgruine Dagstuhl or Burg Dagstuhl) is a ruined castle on the top of a hill near the town of Wadern, kreis Merzig-Wadern, in Saarland, Germany. It overlooks the newer Schloss Dagstuhl in the valley below, which is historic, but has been converted for use as a meeting centre for computer science.

The castle was founded by Knight Boemund of Saarbrücken sometime before 1290, probably for Bohemond I von Warnesberg, Archbishop of Trier. The name derives from the German word for roof, "Dach", because of the roof-like shape of the hill on which the castle stands.

The castle ruins have been archaeologically explored and were improved for public access in 2004.

See also 
 Schloss Dagstuhl

References

External links 
 Burg und Herrschaft Dagstuhl 

Castles in Saarland
Ruined castles in Germany
1290s establishments in the Holy Roman Empire
1290 establishments in Europe